Eupithecia uighurica is a moth in the family Geometridae. It is found in central Asia.

References

Moths described in 2004
uighurica
Moths of Asia